Lozza may refer to:

People
 , Italian priest and poet
 Raúl Lozza (1911–2008), Argentinian painter, draughtsman, designer, journalist, and theorist

Places
 Lozza, Lombardy, Italy

Other
 Lozza (eyewear), Italian luxury eyewear brand